Sankt Ulrich im Mühlkreis is a municipality in the district of Rohrbach in the Austrian state of Upper Austria.

Geography
Sankt Ulrich im Mühlkreis lies in the upper Mühlviertel. About 22 percent of the municipality is forest, and 74 percent is farmland.

References

Cities and towns in Rohrbach District